Ralph St. Louis Pieris Deraniyagala,   was Ceylonese lawyer and civil servant. He was the former Clerk to the House of Representatives (1947–1964) and Clerk of the State Council. 

Born to Sir Paul Edward Pieris, civil servant and scholar, and Lady Hilda Obeyesekere Pieris. His siblings included Paulus Edward Pieris Deraniyagala, Justin Pieris Deraniyagala and Miriam Pieris Deraniyagala. He gained a BA and qualified as a barrister. He married Ezlynn Deraniyagala. 

In July 1947, he was appointed Clerk of the State Council and continued as Clerk to the House of Representatives until his retirement in October 1964. 

He was appointed Member of the Order of the British Empire (MBE) in the 1948 Birthday Honours, an Officer (OBE) in the 1953 Coronation Honours and Commander (CBE) in the 1954 New Year Honours.

References

External links
Portrait of Ralph Deraniyagala, clerk of the Ceylon House of Representatives, at the Commonwealth Parliamentary Association Conference, Canberra, 1959
Secretary-General of Parliament

Sinhalese lawyers
Sri Lankan Buddhists
Sinhalese civil servants
Year of birth missing
Ceylonese Commanders of the Order of the British Empire
People from British Ceylon